The ciliary arteries are divisible into three groups, the long posterior, short posterior, and the anterior.

 The short posterior ciliary arteries from six to twelve in number, arise from the ophthalmic artery as it crosses the optic nerve.
 The long posterior ciliary arteries, two for each eye, pierce the posterior part of the sclera at some little distance from the optic nerve.
 The anterior ciliary arteries are derived from the muscular branches of the ophthalmic artery.

Additional images

References

Arteries of the head and neck